Peter Krick (born 31 January 1944) is a German former competitive figure skater who represented West Germany. He is a three-time (1966–68) national champion and finished in the top ten at seven ISU Championships – four Europeans and three Worlds. At the 1968 Winter Olympics in Grenoble, he placed seventh in the compulsory figures, 16th in the free skate, and 12th overall.

As of 2016, Krick serves as the International Skating Union's sport manager for figure skating. He is married to figure skating judge Sissy Krick.

Competitive highlights

References 

1944 births
Figure skaters at the 1968 Winter Olympics
German male single skaters
Olympic figure skaters of West Germany
Living people
People from Butzbach
Sportspeople from Darmstadt (region)